Syncallia is a genus of moths of the family Yponomeutidae.

Species
Syncallia carteri - Walsingham, 1891 
Syncallia stellata - Guérin-Meneville, 1844 

Yponomeutidae